Jason Thomas Muranka (born 4 August 1989) is a Serbian international rugby league footballer who plays for Oldham in Betfred League 1. He plays as a second row. Of Serbian descent on his mother's side, Muranka has represented the Serbian White Eagles.

Muranka has previously played for the Dewsbury Rams, Doncaster and Keighley Cougars, and spent time on loan at the Gloucestershire All Golds and Newcastle Thunder.

Oldham R.L.F.C. 
On 4 Nov 2021 it was reported that he had signed for Oldham R.L.F.C. in the RFL League 1

References

External links
Doncaster profile
Dewsbury Rams profile

1989 births
Living people
Dewsbury Rams players
Doncaster R.L.F.C. players
English people of Serbian descent
Gloucestershire All Golds players
Keighley Cougars players
Newcastle Thunder players
Oldham R.L.F.C. players
Rugby league players from Bradford
Rugby league second-rows
Serbia national rugby league team players